The Ranganadi Dam is a concrete-gravity diversion dam on the Ranganadi River (also known as Panyor River) in  Arunachal Pradesh, India which serves a run-of-the-river scheme.

Power generation
The dam is intended for hydroelectric purposes and is part of Stage I of the Ranganadi Hydro Electric Project and supports the  Dikrong Power House. Since commissioning, the power house has been generating much less than its capacity because of drought.

Stage II of the project is designed to provide water storage for Stage I and includes a  rock-fill embankment dam with a  storage capacity. This dam will support an additional  power station.

See also

Dibang Dam

References

Dams completed in 2001
Dams in the Brahmaputra River Basin
Dams in Arunachal Pradesh
Gravity dams
Hydroelectric power stations in Arunachal Pradesh
2001 establishments in Arunachal Pradesh
Energy infrastructure completed in 2002